Pultenaea microphylla is a species of flowering plant in the family Fabaceae and is endemic to eastern Australia. It is an erect to prostrate shrub with narrow egg-shaped leaves with the narrower end towards the base, and clusters of up to ten yellow to red flowers with reddish markings.

Description

Taxonomy and naming
Pultenaea microphylla was first formally described in 1825 by Augustin Pyramus de Candolle in Prodromus Systematis Naturalis Regni Vegetabilis from an unpublished description by Franz Sieber.

Distribution and habitat
This pultenaea grows in woodland and forest and is widespread in the Australian Capital Territory, New South Wales and south-eastern Queensland. There is a single record from Tubbut in far north-eastern Victoria.

References

microphylla
Flora of New South Wales
Flora of the Australian Capital Territory
Flora of Victoria (Australia)
Flora of Queensland
Plants described in 1825
Taxa named by Augustin Pyramus de Candolle